Thomas Enevoldsen (born 27 July 1987) is a Danish former professional footballer who played as a forward. He made eleven appearances for the Denmark national team scoring one goal.

Club career

AaB
Enevoldsen was born in Frejlev, a suburb to Aalborg. He got his domestic breakthrough during AaB's championship-winning 2007–08 Danish Superliga season. Enevoldsen played 31 of 33 Superliga games and scored three goals. He also played well at the European stage, and scored a goal at White Hart Lane against Tottenham Hotspur in the 2007–08 UEFA Cup, to put AaB one ahead in a game they eventually lost 3–2. On 3 April 2008, he was selected as Player of the Month in March by the managers and team captains of the Superliga clubs.

Enevoldsen played 28 games in the 2008–09 Danish Superliga season, as well as games in the European 2008–09 UEFA Champions League and 2008–09 UEFA Cup tournaments. In the Summer of 2009, Enevoldsen was linked with a transfer to Benfica.

Groningen
At the start of the 2009–10 Danish Superliga season, Enevoldsen signed a five-year deal with Eredivisie club FC Groningen. Groningen paid a reported DKK 9.3 million (€1.25 million) for him. He scored his first three goals for FC Groningen in the same match on 13 December 2009 against Sparta Rotterdam. All goals were scored from outside of the penalty area.

Mechelen
Following the 2011–12 season, Enevoldsen moved to Mechelen, who had already signed his compatriot Mads Junker earlier in the transfer window. He made his debut on 28 July 2012 in a 4–2 league win over Club Brugge. He began his tenure with the club as a starter, but in his second season he played less. He made 38 total appearances for the club, in which he scored five goals.

AaB (loan)
As a result of his situation, Enevoldsen returned to AaB on a one-year loan deal on 16 June 2014. He made his first appearance after returning to Denmark on 19 July 2014, starting in a 0–0 away draw against SønderjyskE. He scored his first goal after returning on 23 October, in 3–0 shutdown of Dynamo Kyiv in the UEFA Europa League group stage.

Return to AaB
After his loan deal with AaB ended, Enevoldsen agreed to a two-year permanent deal with the club on 19 June 2015. Two successful years followed, in which he made 53 total appearances and scored 19 goals. He left the club upon his contract expiring on 30 June 2017.

NAC Breda
On 30 August 2017, Enevoldsen signed a one-year contract with NAC Breda with the option of an additional year. He made his debut on 20 September in a 4–3 loss to Achilles '29 in the KNVB Cup. Despite the loss, he came on as a substitute and scored the third goal for his club deep into injury time after an assist by Thierry Ambrose. His domestic league debut followed three days later in a 2–0 away win over Feyenoord, coming on as a late substitute and scoring his second goal in two games. After a strong start, Enevoldsen would mostly appear as a substitute during the remainder of the fall. He finished with 12 appearances in which he scored two goals.

Orange County SC
On 10 February 2018, Enevoldsen joined Orange County SC of the United Soccer League. He made his debut for the club 18 March in a 1–1 home draw against Phoenix Rising FC at Championship Soccer Stadium. His first goal for the club came on 29 March as he helped down OKC Energy FC 1–0 for Orange County's first win of 2018. In the following game on 31 March, Enevoldsen notched his first hat-trick for the club in a 5–0 away win over the Tulsa Roughnecks, assisting another. His strong form continued down the stretch for Orange County, adding braces to his record against Portland Timbers 2 and Las Vegas Lights FC. He finished the season as the club's top goalscorer with 20 goals in 34 appearances in which he added nine assists, earning him second place in the 2018 USL Golden Boot race, only behind Cameron Lancaster, and a spot on the USL All-League First Team. In his 2018 season, Enevoldsen set the Orange County SC single-season goal scoring record.

Indy Eleven
On 29 January 2019, Enevoldsen moved to USL side Indy Eleven.

Sacramento Republic
On 12 August 2019, Enevoldsen transferred to Sacramento Republic for the remainder of the 2019 USL Championship season.

Return to Orange County
On 25 December 2019, Enevoldsen signed a contract to return to Orange County SC. Enevoldsen was loaned out to newly relegated Danish 1st Division club Hobro IK on 2 September 2020 for the rest of the year.

Retirement
Enevoldsen retired from professional football after his final game for Orange County SC on 28 November 2021, playing the closing 30 minutes of the 2021 USL Championship final, which ended with his team lifting a trophy at Al Lang Stadium after defeating the Tampa Bay Rowdies with the final score of 3–1. He would instead focus on a media company he co-founded in 2016.

International career
Enevoldsen made his international debut with the Under-18 national selection in September 2004. He played a total of 26 youth international matches.

In October 2009, Enevoldsen was called up for the Denmark national team for the 2010 FIFA World Cup qualifying games against Sweden and Hungary. He made his debut when he replaced Søren Larsen for the second half of the match against Hungary. He scored his first international goal in a May 2010 friendly match against Senegal. He played one game in the 2010 FIFA World Cup.

Career statistics

International
Scores and results list Denmark's goal tally first, score column indicates score after each Enevoldsen goal.

Honours
AaB
 Danish Superliga: 2007–08

Orange County SC
 USL Championship: 2021

References

External links

Voetbal International profile
Danish Superliga statistics
Career statistics at Danmarks Radio

1987 births
Living people
Sportspeople from Aalborg
Association football midfielders
Danish men's footballers
Denmark international footballers
Denmark youth international footballers
Denmark under-21 international footballers
2010 FIFA World Cup players
Danish Superliga players
Danish 1st Division players
Eredivisie players
Belgian Pro League players
USL Championship players
AaB Fodbold players
FC Groningen players
Indy Eleven players
K.V. Mechelen players
NAC Breda players
Orange County SC players
Sacramento Republic FC players
Hobro IK players
Danish expatriate men's footballers
Danish expatriate sportspeople in the Netherlands
Expatriate footballers in the Netherlands
Danish expatriate sportspeople in Belgium
Expatriate footballers in Belgium
Danish expatriate sportspeople in the United States
Expatriate soccer players in the United States